The Synagogue Edmond Safra is a synagogue at 15 Avenue de la Costa in Monte Carlo, Monaco. It is run by the Association Cultuelle Israelite de Monaco (ACIM).

The synagogue was built by J.B. Pastor & Fils and completed in 2017 after a construction period of a year and five months. The synagogue was inaugurated in March 2017 in a ceremony attended by Albert II, Prince of Monaco and Aliza Bin-Noun, the Israeli ambassador to France and Monaco.

See also
The Edmond J. Safra Synagogue in Manhattan, New York City

References

External links

Orthodox synagogues
Synagogues completed in 2017
Synagogues in Monaco
Religious buildings and structures in Monaco
2017 establishments in Monaco